Aaliyan Mehmood (born 25 December 2004) is a Pakistani cricketer. He made his List A debut on 8 January 2021, for Sindh, in the 2020–21 Pakistan Cup.

References

External links
 

2004 births
Living people
Pakistani cricketers
Sindh cricketers
Place of birth missing (living people)